James Macartney may refer to:
 James MacCartney (Doctor) Scottish apothecary active in 1590s Edinburgh
 James Macartney (anatomist) (1770–1843), Irish anatomist
 James Macartney (died 1727), Irish judge and MP for Belfast 1692–1703
 James Macartney (1692–1770), Irish MP for Longford Borough 1713–27 and Granard 1727–60
 Jim Macartney (1911–1977), Australian newspaper editor

See also
James McCartney (disambiguation)